Renet may refer to:

Renet Tilley, a character in the Teenage Mutant Ninja Turtles franchise

People with the surname
Françoise Renet (1924–1995), French classical organist
 (born 1964), French chess player